Ribes sanchezii is a species of currant, named after Peruvian botanist Isidoro Sánchez Vega of Cajamarca. This species of Ribes is distinct form both R. andicola and R. colandina because of its ovate to elliptical leaves with a very poorly developed lateral lobe and its aberrant indument. The two latter species have leaves with pubescence on both the adaxial and abaxial surface and the adaxial leaf surface is matt green, whereas R. sanchezii has a shiny dark green upper leaf surface and pubescence abaxially restricted to the primary and secondary veins. Ribes sanchezii also has strongly resupinate fruits, whereas the fruits of R. andicola and R. colandina are pendulous.

Description
The fruit strongly resupinate.

Distribution
La Libertad. It replaces widespread R. colandina on the eastern slopes of the Cordillera Oriental and forms dense stands at the upper limit of the cloud forest at the Abra CallaCalla, where it is one of the most abundant shrub species.

References

External links

NGBR Herbarium Specimen

sanchezii
Flora of Peru
Plants described in 2005
Dioecious plants